, is a Japanese singer, actress and model. She was a former member of the Japan's idol group Coco in the late 1990s.

Biography 
Azusa was born in Atsugi, Kanagawa, Japan, and made her solo debut on 4 September 1991. She was a founding member of Coco, though she left in 1992. She has since retired from the entertainment business. She married baseball player Takuro Ishii in 1996, but the marriage ended in divorce four years later.

Discography

Singles
 
 Released: September 4, 1991
 
 Released: January 15, 1992
 
 Released: June 3, 1992
 
 Released: October 21, 1992
 I miss you
 Released: February 19, 1993
 
 Released: June 18, 1993
 
 Released: October 21, 1993

Albums
 21 August 1992:  Crystal Eyes  [PCCA-00388]
 21 July 1993:  Horizon  [PCCA-00468]

Picture Books
 2 October 1991: Yokan
 25 October 1992: Liberty

References

External links
Art.Webtown Recent Photobooks

1973 births
Living people
Japanese women pop singers
Actresses from Kanagawa Prefecture
Musicians from Kanagawa Prefecture
People from Atsugi, Kanagawa
Models from Kanagawa Prefecture
21st-century Japanese singers
21st-century Japanese women singers